"We Used to Wait" is the first UK single from Arcade Fire's third album The Suburbs, following "Ready to Start", which was the first US single. It was released on August 1, 2010 in the UK.

The Wilderness Downtown 

The song was used in an experimental project, The Wilderness Downtown, an interactive music video developed by Google Creative Lab and Chris Milk, to experiment and exploit HTML 5 and the Google Chrome web browser. It figures prominently in the location-based audiovisual web experience and the name of the project is taken from a line in the song. Rolling Stone named the 'thewildernessdowntown.com' one of the best music videos of 2010. In July 2011, the music video was named one of "The 30 All-TIME Best Music Videos" by TIME Magazine. Viewers were invited to fill out a virtual postcard at the conclusion of the video and the postcards were used to populate background visual for "We Used to Wait" during the Suburbs tour. In February 2011, music video blog Yes, We've Got a Video! ranked the project at number 2 in their top 30 videos of 2010. The project was praised as a "beautiful experiment that has significantly pushed the boundaries of the music video by introducing the factor of interactivity."

Recording and production
Like the rest of the album, "We Used to Wait" was mixed through vintage analog consoles in Montreal and New York by Craig Silvey. In an interview with Paul Tingen, Silvey provided additional information on the challenges with "We Used to Wait"; he stated that the massive number of individual tracks on the premixed recording, over thirty, and elements like the use of three drum kits, was particularly challenging to mix because of the complexity of the textures.

Reception 

Rolling Stone named "We Used to Wait" the 5th best song of 2010. Not all reviews were positive: Pop Sugar's Thomas Britt stated the track was "mawkish" and "failed to take off."

In 2017 Paste magazine named it number eleven of the best fifteen Arcade Fire songs and name the song the lynchpin of the entire Suburbs album.

Covers 

On 20 October 2010, Mark Ronson and Business Intl, featuring Alex Greenwald on both vocals and the mandolin, and Rose Dougall on backing vocals, covered the song on Jo Whiley’s BBC Radio 1 show.  The Drums also covered this song.

Chart performance

References 

2010 singles
Arcade Fire songs
Merge Records singles
Songs written by William Butler (musician)
Songs written by Win Butler
Songs written by Régine Chassagne
Songs written by Jeremy Gara
Songs written by Tim Kingsbury
Songs written by Richard Reed Parry
2010 songs
Rough Trade Records singles